Orv Otten is a retired American football coach. He served as the head coach at Northwestern College in Orange City, Iowa from 1995 to 2008, compiling a record of 105–45.

Head coaching record

References

Year of birth missing (living people)
Living people
Iowa State Cyclones football coaches
Monmouth Fighting Scots football coaches
Northwestern Red Raiders football coaches
Northwestern Red Raiders football players
Upper Iowa Peacocks football coaches